Futbol Club Barcelona Handbol is a Spanish handball team based in Barcelona, Catalonia. It is a part of the FC Barcelona multi sports club, and was founded on 29 November 1942. The club competes domestically in the Liga ASOBAL and in the European Champions League. It is the most successful handball club in Spain and Europe with a record number of domestic and international titles.

History 

The handball section of Futbol Club Barcelona was founded on 29 November 1942 during the presidency of Enrique Piñeyro. In the beginning handball was played with eleven players per team and did not have a specialized field to play. They used football fields until the late 1950s, when they started to play, as in actual games, with seven players and a covered field.

In the early stages, competitions were dominated by other teams like Atlético de Madrid and Granollers, breaking their domination few times. Things changed radically with the arrival of one of the best coaches in handball history, Valero Rivera. With him, the team became virtually unbeatable in Spain and in Europe, winning a record of 62 trophies under his rule, including 5 consecutive European Cups.

In the summer of 2013, the Barça handball team, conducted by the head coach Xavi Pascual, won the IHF Super Globe trophy, the only trophy that was still missing from the club's trophy cabinet.

FC Barcelona’s handball team closed out the 2013/14 Liga ASOBAL with a record-breaking winning run. Barça made history this season when they completed their Liga ASOBAL without dropping any points from all 30 match days.

FC Barcelona successfully defended its IHF Super Globe title in 2014, marking the first time a team has won back-to-back titles since the most prestigious club handball event has been hosted annually in the Qatari capital Doha.

Again, FC Barcelona handball team ended the 2014/2015 Liga ASOBAL season unbeaten for the second consecutive year.

FC Barcelona handball team won the seven titles disputed the 2014/2015 season, something which had not happened since the 1999/2000 season with Valero Rivera's Dream Team.

In 2017 FC Barcelona handball was again champion of the IHF Super Globe after beating the German team Füchse Berlin.

In 2018, the club won the Super Globe trophy again, for the fourth time. In a repeat of last year the team of head coach Xavi Pascual won the IHF Super Globe Final against Füchse Berlin, this time by a five-goal difference, 29–24.

Again Barça won the IHF Super Globe in 2019, their third in a row. The team led by Xavi Pascual beat THW Kiel 34–32.

In 2021 Barça regain the European throne six years after the last title, winning the final against Aalborg Håndbold (36–23), at the end of an absolutely impeccable season: 6/6 titles and 61/61 victories. Xavi Pascual's team secured the section's 10th Champions League and also became the first team to lift the golden net, the new trophy for the European champions from this season, as a replacement for the bronze arm. The title concludes a season with an emotional ending, since it marks the conclusion of a cycle and the goodbye of several players, in addition to David Barrufet, Xavi Pascual and Fernando Barbeito.  Former Dream Team player, Carlos Ortega was chosen to be FC Barcelona's new handball coach for the next three seasons.

In the 2021–22 season, after the successes achieved the previous season, the azulgrana certified a new sextet, where the only title that escaped was the Super Globe in October. The team won the Spanish Super Cup, the Catalan Super Cup, the Copa del Rey, the Sacyr ASOBAL League, the Sacyr ASOBAL Cup, and finally the Champions League. The team ended the season winning the 11th Champions League in Barça history. Barça revalidated the title in Cologne, being the first team to win two consecutive years with the new final four format, and extended its dominance in the historic record of the Handball Champions League.

Kits

Trophies 

 IHF Super Globe: 5 – record
 2013, 2014, 2017, 2018, 2019
 EHF Champions League: 11 – record
 1990–91, 1995–96, 1996–97, 1997–98, 1998–99, 1999–2000, 2004–05, 2010–11, 2014–15, 2020–21, 2021–22
 EHF Cup Winner's Cup: 5 – record
 1983–84, 1984–85, 1985–86, 1993–94, 1994–95
 EHF Cup
 2002–03
 European Super Cup: 5 – record
 1996–97, 1997–98, 1998–99, 1999–00, 2003–04
 Liga ASOBAL: 29 – record
 1968–69, 1972–73, 1979–80, 1981–82, 1985–86, 1987–88, 1988–89, 1989–90, 1990–91, 1991–92, 1995–96, 1996–97, 1997–98, 1998–99, 1999–2000, 2002–03, 2005–06, 2010–11, 2011–12, 2012–13, 2013–14, 2014–15, 2015–16, 2016–17, 2017–18, 2018–19, 2019–20, 2020–21, 2021–22
 Copa del Rey: 26 – record
 1968–69, 1971–72, 1972–73, 1982–83, 1983–84, 1984–85, 1987–88, 1989–90, 1992–93, 1993–94, 1996–97, 1997–98, 1999–2000, 2003–04, 2006–07, 2008–09, 2009–10, 2013–14, 2014–15, 2015–16, 2016–17, 2017–18, 2018–19, 2019–20, 2020–21, 2021–22 
 Copa ASOBAL: 18 – record
 1994–95, 1995–96, 1999–00, 2000–01, 2001–02, 2009–10, 2011–12, 2012–13, 2013–14, 2014–15, 2015–16, 2016–17, 2017–18, 2018–19, 2019–20, 2020–21, 2021–22, 2022–23
 Supercopa ASOBAL: 24 – record
 1986–87, 1988–89, 1989–90, 1990–91, 1991–92, 1993–94, 1996–97, 1997–98, 1999–00, 2000–01, 2003–04, 2006–07, 2008–09, 2009–10, 2012–13, 2013–14, 2014–15, 2015–16, 2016–17, 2017–18, 2018–19, 2019–20, 2020–21, 2021–22
 Supercopa Ibérica: 1 – record
 2022
 Spanish Championship: 6 – record
 1944–45, 1945–46, 1946–47, 1948–49, 1950–51, 1956–57
 Catalan Championship: 10 – record
 1943–44, 1944–45, 1945–46, 1946–47, 1948–49, 1950–51, 1953–54, 1954–55, 1956–57, 1957–58
 Catalan League: 12 – record
 1981–82, 1982–83, 1983–84, 1984–85, 1986–87, 1987–88, 1990–91, 1991–92, 1992–93, 1993–94, 1994–95, 1996–97
 Pyrenees League: 12 – record
 1997–98, 1998–99, 1999–00, 2000–01, 2001–02, 2003–04, 2005–06, 2006–07, 2007–08, 2009–10, 2010–11, 2011–12
 Catalan Super Cup: 10 – record
 2012, 2014, 2015, 2016, 2017, 2018, 2019, 2020, 2021, 2022
 Double: 15
 1968–69, 1972–73, 1987–88, 1989–90, 1996–97, 1997–98, 1999–00, 2013–14, 2014–15, 2015–16, 2016–17, 2017–18, 2018–19, 2019–20, 2020–21
 Triple Crown: 5
 1996–97, 1997–98, 1999–00, 2014–15, 2020–21

Season by season 

 31 seasons in Liga ASOBAL

Season by season (B team)

European record

Team

Staff 

Staff for the 2022–23 season
 General Manager  Xavier O'Callaghan
 Head coach  Antonio Carlos Ortega
 Assistant coach  Konstantin Igropulo
 Assistant coach  Tomas Svensson
 Assistant coach  Jordi Rosell
 Goalkeeping coach  Roger Font
 Physiotherapist  Sebastià Salas 
 Club doctor  Josep A. Gutiérrez

Current squad 
Squad for the 2022–23 season

Goalkeeper
1  Gonzalo Pérez de Vargas (c)
 12  Emil Nielsen 
Left Wingers
 13  Aitor Ariño 
 15  Hampus Wanne
Right Wingers
 18  Blaž Janc
 20  Aleix Gómez 
Line players
 33  Artur Parera
 72  Ludovic Fabregas 
 82  Luís Frade

Left Backs
9  Jonathan Carlsbogård
 19  Timothey N'Guessan 
 22  Thiagus dos Santos
 37  Haniel Langaro 
Central Backs
6  Pol Valera
 25  Luka Cindrić 
 35  Domen Makuc
Right Backs
 10  Dika Mem 
 66  Melvyn Richardson

Transfers 
Transfers for the 2023–24 season

 Joining
 
 Leaving
  Ludovic Fabregas (P) (to  Telekom Veszprém)

Notable former coaches 

  Antonio Lázaro
  Josep Vilà
  Sergio Petit
  Miquel Roca
  Valero Rivera (1983–2003)
  Xesco Espar (2004–2007)
  Manolo Cadenas (2007–2009)
  Xavier Pascual Fuertes (2009–2021)
  Antonio Carlos Ortega (2021–present)

Notable former players 

  Mikel Aguirrezabalaga
  David Barrufet
  Joan Cañellas
  Alberto Entrerríos
  Raúl Entrerríos
  Rubén Garabaya
  Juanín García
  Mateo Garralda
  Òscar Grau
  Rafael Guijosa
  Demetrio Lozano
  Enric Masip
  Xavier O'Callaghan
  Antonio Carlos Ortega
  Salvador Puig
  Lorenzo Rico
  Albert Rocas
  Iker Romero
  Joan Sagalés
  Víctor Tomás González
  Cristian Ugalde
  Iñaki Urdangarín
  Arpad Šterbik
  Andrei Xepkin
  Eric Gull
  Senjanin Maglajlija
  Muhamed Memić 
  Danijel Šarić
  Siarhei Rutenka
  Marco Oneto
  Patrik Ćavar
  Davor Dominiković
  Venio Losert
  Igor Vori
  Marko Kopljar
  Michal Kasal
  Filip Jícha
  Lasse Andersson
  Joachim Boldsen
  Mikkel Hansen
  Kasper Hvidt
  Lars Krogh Jeppesen
  Kevin Møller
  Casper Ulrich Mortensen
  Jesper Nøddesbo
  Ali Zein
  Kiril Lazarov
  Borko Ristovski
  Jérôme Fernandez
  Nikola Karabatić
  Yanis Lenne
  Cédric Sorhaindo
  Christian Schwarzer
  Erhard Wunderlich
  László Nagy
  Aron Pálmarsson
  Guðjón Valur Sigurðsson
  Frode Hagen
  Glenn Solberg
  Kamil Syprzak
  Bogdan Wenta
  Alexandru Dedu
  Konstantin Igropulo
  Mladen Bojinović
  Ivan Lapčević
  Petar Nenadić
  Dejan Perić
  Nenad Peruničić
  Dragan Škrbić
  Jure Dolenec
  Luka Žvižej
  Mattias Andersson
  Mathias Franzén
  Magnus Jernemyr
  Jonas Larholm
  Fredrik Ohlander
  Johan Sjöstrand
  Tomas Svensson
  Walid Ben Amor
  Wael Jallouz
  Petrit Fejzula
  Milan Kalina
  Zlatko Portner
  Veselin Vujović
  Veselin Vuković

Stadium information 

 Name: – Palau Blaugrana
 City: – Barcelona
 Capacity: – 7,500 people
 Address: – Av.Arístides Maillol, s/n

References

External links 
 Official website
 FCB Handbol on Facebook

 
Handball
Catalan handball clubs
Liga ASOBAL teams
1942 establishments in Spain
Handball clubs established in 1942